Joseph Satterthwaite is the name of:

Joe Satterthwaite (1885–?), English footballer
Joseph C. Satterthwaite (1900–1990), American politician